The following is a list of colleges and universities in the U.S. state of Nebraska.

Public colleges and universities
There are three regular and two specialized universities in the University of Nebraska system. The Nebraska State College System has three member institutions.

Private liberal arts colleges

Private colleges and universities

Community colleges
The following community colleges are members of the Nebraska Community College Association. In 1971, the Nebraska Legislature began development on a plan to merge the vocational-technical schools and junior colleges. In July 1973, the Nebraska Community College system was established with legislation (LB 759) consolidating junior colleges and vocational/technical schools.

Defunct colleges

See also
 List of college athletic programs in Nebraska
 List of colleges and universities in Omaha, Nebraska
 Higher education in the United States
 List of American institutions of higher education
 List of recognized higher education accreditation organizations
 List of colleges and universities
 List of colleges and universities by country

References

External links
Department of Education listing of accredited institutions in Nebraska
Nebraska's Coordinating Commission for Postsecondary Education - Directory of Postsecondary Institutions in Nebraska

Nebraska
Colleges